The Make-Up Artists and Hair Stylists Guild Award for Best Period and/or Character Hair Styling in a Feature-Length Motion Picture is one of the awards given annually to people working in the motion picture industry by the Make-Up Artists and Hair Stylists Guild (MUAHS). It is presented to the hair stylists whose work has been deemed "best" in a given year, within a period-set film, and/or for specific character hair styling. The award was first given in 2014, during the sixth annual awards. For the first five ceremonies, the period and character aspects of the category were separated, and awarded individually.

Winners and nominees

1990s
Best Period Hair Styling- Feature

2000s
Best Character Hair Styling - FeatureBest Period Hair Styling - Feature2010sBest Period and/or Character Makeup - Feature FilmsBest Period and/or Character Make-Up in a Feature-Length Motion Picture'''

2020s

References

Period and/or Character Hair Styling in a Feature-Length Motion Picture